U.S. Route 20 (US 20) is the portion of an east–west U.S. Highway in the state of Idaho.

Since 2019, US 20 has been designated as the Idaho Medal of Honor Highway.

Route description

It joins US 95 and runs southbound to Parma. US 20/US 26 leaves US 95 southeast of Parma and runs to Caldwell, where it briefly joins Interstate 84 (I-84) (and US 30) from exit 26 until exit 29.

These four highways parallel each other east (on two roadways) to Boise where US 20/US 26 runs through downtown, then southbound on Broadway Avenue to rejoin with I-84/US 30 at exit 54. This portion of the route is near Goodale's Cutoff of the Oregon Trail.

US 20/US 26 continues east, into and across Camas County through Fairfield to Timmerman Junction, the intersection in Blaine County with State Highway 75 (SH-75), the northbound route to Sun Valley, Galena Summit, and Stanley. US 20/US 26 goes through Picabo and Carey, joins with US 93, and on to Craters of the Moon and Arco, where US 93 splits off and turns north-northwest to climb the Big Lost River valley. 

US 20/US 26 continues on through the Idaho National Laboratory, where the highways split just west of Atomic City; US 26 heads southeast to Blackfoot and US 20 to Idaho Falls, where it turns north-northeast to pass near Rexburg as a freeway.

History

US 20 was expanded past Yellowstone National Park in 1940, replacing the original US 191 and several state highways. Its original alignment through Boise included Main Street and Fairview Avenue for westbound and eastbound traffic, respectively, and Capitol Boulevard. US 20 and US 26 were realigned onto Myrtle and Front streets as well as Broadway following the completion of the Boise Connector extension on August 7, 1992.

The Rigby Freeway section of US 20, extending from Idaho Falls to St. Anthony, was constructed in the 1970s. Its northernmost section still featured at-grade intersections until the 2000s, when they were replaced with full interchanges.

Junction list

References

External links

20
 Idaho
Transportation in Payette County, Idaho
Transportation in Canyon County, Idaho
Transportation in Ada County, Idaho
Transportation in Elmore County, Idaho
Transportation in Camas County, Idaho
Transportation in Blaine County, Idaho
Transportation in Butte County, Idaho
Transportation in Bingham County, Idaho
Transportation in Bonneville County, Idaho
Transportation in Jefferson County, Idaho
Transportation in Madison County, Idaho
Transportation in Fremont County, Idaho